Royal Russell School is an independent school in the Shirley area of Croydon, South London. It is a co-educational day and boarding school. The motto of the school is Non sibi sed omnibus meaning "Not for one's self but for all". The school is a member of the Headmasters' and Headmistresses' Conference. The patron of the school was Queen Elizabeth II.

There are 900 pupils at the Royal Russell School, aged between three and 18. The school occupies a site of over 100 acres (0.40 km2) in gardens in a wooded estate two miles south-east of Croydon. The School moved the boys' part of the school from Russell Hill in Purley to the Ballards site in 1924, then moving the girls' section of the school completely to the Ballards site in 1961, and selling the original school site on Russell Hill in Purley in 1961. The Junior and Lower Junior schools are in separate buildings from the Senior School, but are on the same site.

History 

In 1924 the school moved to its present site two miles (3 km) south-east of Croydon within the ancient (and ecclesiastical) parish of Addington, taking over a  lightly wooded estate. Its buildings include a fine chapel and modern facilities. The school is affiliated to the Church of England, and the approach to daily life is founded on Christian principles, but pupils of all faiths are admitted.

Since the 1970s new and better facilities have been built, numbers of girls have increased and the academic record has been good. The school has enjoyed royal patronage from its early days and Queen Elizabeth II visited the school on four occasions. Her first visit was in 1950 as Princess Elizabeth; in 1963 she opened Cambridge House and the Practical Block: she joined the celebrations of 125 years in 1979 and the sesquicentenary in 2003.

The school is now independent of the Warehousemen, Clerks and Drapers livery companies and operates as a charity under the direction of its own board of governors. Extensive changes have taken place in recent years and today there is an IAPS Junior School and HMC Senior School on the one hundred acre estate.

In 2003 the school held celebrations to mark its sesquicentennial year, being commemorated by Queen Elizabeth II visiting the school to open the library and Sixth Form Centre. In 2010 Prince Edward, Earl of Wessex visited the school, officially opening the Performing Arts Centre.

Academic 
The most recent ISI report, carried out in 2016, assessed the school in 10 specific areas on a 3-point scale: unsatisfactory, satisfactory and good. In certain circumstances if the lead inspector decides that the standard exceeds those set nationally then an 'excellent' grading can be given. The inspection lasted from March 15 to March 18 (3 days), and in all 10 categories tested Royal Russell School achieved an 'excellent' grading.

Royal Russell's Boarding provision was inspected too, as part of a 3-year cycle by Ofsted in which inspectors spent 3 days reviewing the Boarding provision. The inspectors were very impressed by all that is done for the schools boarding community and thus obtained a 'Good' classification in each of the 6 categories inspected. The Ofsted report can be found on the Royal Russell School site or here.

GCSE is taught from years 10 and 11, though it is possible to study maths a year early, starting in year 9 and completing the course in year 10. Required GCSE subjects include Triple Science (or Double Award Science), English Language, English Literature, Maths, and a language, (French, Spanish or English as a Foreign Language). GCSE choices include: French, Spanish, Geography, History, Business Studies, Drama, Art, Music, Design Technology, Food Technology, Philosophy and Ethics, Physical Education, and ICT. There are a choice of 19 subjects at GCSE including the compulsory subjects. Students undertake the required 5 subjects (if studying Triple Award Science this equates to 6), plus 4 of their choice.

The sixth form at Royal Russell follows the reformed A level Course. Sixth formers are able to undertake four A levels (during their first year. Some carry on with four A2's, but many carry on in upper sixth with three of these as A Levels, or three A2's and dropping the subject to AS. There are over 23 subjects available. 34% of sixth form students take science A-levels; 25% arts/humanities; 41% both. The sixth form attained 45% A* - A grades in 2019. The school has a strong track record of sending students to Russell Group institutions and attains successful offers to Oxford and Cambridge.

School structure 
The school is based on a house system having two boarding houses for boys (Oxford and Cambridge), whilst there are two boarding houses for girls (Queens and Hollenden).  There are three day-houses for boys (Keable, Madden and St Andrews), and two day-houses for girls (Buchanan and Reade). Each house has its own Head of House and House Sports Captain. The school elects prefects each year, and has a Head Boy, Head Girl, and a Deputy Head Boy and Deputy Head Girl, along with a Girls' Head of Sports and Boys' Head of Sports as the senior prefects of the school. Each house has its own prefects that help aid the school during day-to-day running and school functions.

Each year the school's boys' houses compete in sports competitions in the annual house football (outdoor and indoor), hockey, basketball, badminton, table tennis, tennis, cricket, sports day activities and the cross-country event. The girls' houses participate in many of the same activities with the odd exception in a few of the sports listed earlier as they participate in competitions in netball as well, amongst others. The house points are added up at the end of the year and are announced on Royal Russell Day, where the house shields and trophies are awarded.

Every week the senior school holds an assembly, which is split into one for the juniors and another for the seniors. All students attend a weekly chapel service which is split up depending on the student's house membership.

School headmasters 
1854-1855 Mr A F Gaultier, MCP
1855-1855 Mr Skaife

New Cross
1855-1857 Mr E H Roberts
1857-1858 Mr Sansbury
1858-1866 Mr F Gruzelier

Russell Hill, Purley
1856-1866 Mr F Gruzelier
1866-1870 Mr J Combs
1870-1871 Mr J Putnam
1871-1877 Mr J Garnett
1877-1878 (Acting) Mr Jones
1878-1896 Mr A G Ayles, AKC
1896-1905 Mr C Collis, MA
1905-1914 Mr C B Gutteridge, MA
1914-1937 Mr G A Roberts, MA

Ballards Estate
1921-1924 Mr F J Turner, MA
1924-1937 Mr G A Roberts, MA

Royal Russell School, Ballards Estate (Co-educational)
1937-1967 Mr F A V Madden MA (Oxon)
1967-1974 Mr N Bradshaw, MA
1974-1980 Mr S Hopewell, MA
 Sept - Dec 1980 Mr A H Foot, MA (acting Headmaster)
 Jan 1981-1996 Mr R D Balaam, MA Cantab, JP
1996-2011 Dr J R Jennings, BSc, PhD, FRSA
2011–Present, Mr C J Hutchinson, BMet Sheffield, MInst P, FRSA

School terms 
All terms have a half-term holiday.

 Autumn Term - Early September to mid-December (most pupils join the school during this term) Half term in Mid October for 2 weeks
 Spring Term - Early January to early April- Half term in February for 1 week
 Summer Term - Late April to early July- Half term in June for 1 week usually before Summer Exams for Years 7-10.

Visits and open areas
In 2003 Tim Henman opened the school's new sports hall, including two gymnasiums and multiple locker rooms. The author Michael Morpurgo opened the Junior School library. In 2014 the athlete David Weir opened the new all-weather sports pitches. Other notable visitors include the newsreader Sir Trevor McDonald, the poet Brian Moses and the writer Jeremy Strong.

Extra-curricular activities 
The school teaches music, drama and art. The Drama department have their own drama studios and a purpose-built theatre. It regularly holds school plays. Old Russellians have participated in events such as the Edinburgh Fringe Festival. The music department have facilities including a recording studio and numerous practice rooms. The school choir and Barbershop both actively participate far abroad. There are facilities for sports and games, including a large sports hall, gymnasium, indoor swimming pool, tennis courts, and floodlit pitches. Other facilities include a prep library, senior library and sixth form study centre and sixth form cafe. There is a plentiful range of clubs and societies.  Full use is made of the estate. The school arranges cultural visits, expeditions abroad such as the annual ski trip to the Rocky Mountains, various language department trips, expeditions to the Himalayas and Peru, and the various geography department trips. In 2008 the school held a trip for students allowing them to go to Kenya to help Magnet High School for a month. Royal Russell School had been helping to donate money to Magnet High School over the past years forming a strong relationship with the Kenyan school.

Royal Russell School Model United Nations 
The school is greatly involved in the Model United Nations (MUN) encouraging students from year 9 onwards to join. The School's MUN holds regular meetings and debates at least once a week on numerous current global issues. The school holds an annual four-day international MUN conference in October, and was the first school in Britain to host one, first holding a Model United Nations conference in 1981. Students at the school play a significant role in the conference they form the group of Officers that run the conference. It attracts schools from as far away as Japan and California with up to 500 delegates attending. The School's MUN participates in the largest conference in the world, The Hague international Model United Nations conference every year and is affiliated to them. The schools MUN attends conferences at St Andrew's College MUN (Dublin), Haileybury MUN (Hertfordshire), The Hague MUN (Hague-THIMUN), Benenden MUN (Kent) and Reigate Grammar MUN (Reigate) to name a few.

Royal Russell Combined Cadet Force 
The school has a contingent of the Combined Cadet Force with an Army section (affiliated to the Royal Electrical and Mechanical Engineers) and an RAF section. The CCF serves in teaching cadets the art of leadership, as well as an extensive variety of other skills and qualifications. Formal qualifications include the BTEC Diploma in Public Services run via the Cadet Vocational Qualifications Organisation (CVQO). The Royal Russell CCF contingent is also in partnership with a local school allowing their students to join the contingent.The schools CCF contingent parades once a week on Monday evenings.

Alumni

Notable Old Russellians include:
Ali Ansari - Professor in Modern History at the University of St. Andrews
Martin Clunes - Actor
Elly Jackson - Vocalist of the musical duo La Roux
Phil Lewis - Vocalist for the hard rock band L.A. Guns
Bill Lloyd - multi-instrumentalist and long-time touring member for indie rock band Placebo (band)
Naoko Mori - Actor
Tom Wright - Architect and designer
Neville Keighley - Singer/songwriter who uses the stage name Belouis Some
Mims Davies - Conservative Politician
Mya-Lecia Naylor - Actress
Rhys Norrington-Davies - Footballer

References

External links
 Official website
 Profile on the ISC website
 Profile on the HMC website

1853 establishments in England
Boarding schools in London
Educational institutions established in 1853
Private co-educational schools in London
Private schools in the London Borough of Croydon
Member schools of the Headmasters' and Headmistresses' Conference